No Secrets is the debut extended play album from American country music singer-songwriter Barry Zito.

Background and release 
Zito used his time off during 2015, the final year of his professional baseball career, played in Nashville, Tennessee, to learn from the city's music industry professionals and to pursue songwriting. Zito wrote "Home" by himself while the other tracks were co-written. No Secrets was released digitally on iTunes and on compact disc on January 27, 2017. The album ranked number 18 on the Billboard Top Heatseekers Albums chart and sold 1,000 copies in its first week of release.

Track listing

Chart performance

References 

2017 debut EPs
Country music EPs
EPs by American artists